Eucamptopus is a monotypic genus of Indian nursery web spiders containing the single species, Eucamptopus coronatus. It was first described by Reginald Innes Pocock in 1900, and is only found in India.

See also
 List of Pisauridae species

References

Monotypic Araneomorphae genera
Pisauridae
Spiders of the Indian subcontinent
Taxa named by R. I. Pocock